Michael Thomas Kohn (born June 26, 1986) is an American former professional baseball pitcher. He was drafted by the Los Angeles Angels in the 13th round (409th overall) of the 2008 Major League Baseball draft after playing college baseball at the College of Charleston. He made his Major League Baseball (MLB) debut with the Angels in 2010, and also played for the Atlanta Braves.

Professional career

Los Angeles Angels of Anaheim
Kohn made his major league debut on July 26, 2010 against the Boston Red Sox at Angel Stadium of Anaheim. He finished the season appearing in 24 games, going 2-0. In 2011, Kohn struggled with control, walking 9 in 12.1 innings and allowing 10 runs. He spent the entire 2012 season on the disabled list due to Tommy John surgery. Fully healthy in 2013, Kohn was a bullpen mainstay for the Angels, appearing in a career high 63 games. On September 2, 2014, Kohn was designated for assignment. On September 8, 2014, Kohn chose free agency rather than accepting a demotion to the minors.

Tampa Bay Rays
On October 16, 2014, Kohn signed a major league contract with the Tampa Bay Rays. He was designated for assignment on November 20.

Atlanta Braves
On December 4, 2014, Kohn was signed to a minor league deal by the Atlanta Braves, a deal that included an invite to Spring Training. He was sent to minor league camp on March 30, 2015 and began the season with the Gwinnett Braves. On April 24, Kohn was recalled and made his Braves' debut two days later. He became a free agent on October 5, 2015.

Minnesota Twins
On July 21, 2017, Kohn signed a minor league deal with the Minnesota Twins. He was released on March 25, 2018.

Arizona Diamondbacks
On February 8, 2019, Kohn signed a minor league contract with the Diamondbacks. He elected free agency on November 7, 2019.

Second Stint with Angels
On February 1, 2020, Kohn signed a minor league deal with the Los Angeles Angels. He became a free agent on November 2, 2020.

On March 25, 2021, Kohn announced his retirement from professional baseball on Instagram.

References

External links

1986 births
Living people
People from Camden, South Carolina
Baseball players from South Carolina
Major League Baseball pitchers
Los Angeles Angels players
Atlanta Braves players
College of Charleston Cougars baseball players
Orem Owlz players
Cedar Rapids Kernels players
Rancho Cucamonga Quakes players
Arkansas Travelers players
Salt Lake Bees players
Gigantes del Cibao players
American expatriate baseball players in the Dominican Republic
Gulf Coast Braves players
Gwinnett Braves players
Gulf Coast Twins players
Fort Myers Miracle players
Rochester Red Wings players
Arizona League Diamondbacks players
Jackson Generals (Southern League) players
Reno Aces players
USC Upstate Spartans baseball players